Eutelephia is a monotypic moth genus of the family Erebidae erected by George Hampson in 1926. Its only species, Eutelephia aureopicta, was first described by George Hamilton Kenrick in 1917. It is found on Madagascar.

It has a wingspan of about 30 mm. The forewings are bronze, with grey lines and chocolate blotches. the hindwings are whitish with a broad fuscous margin.

References

Calpinae
Moths described in 1917
Moths of Madagascar
Monotypic moth genera